Birley Spa is a grade-II listed community bath hall and a Victorian bathhouse in the Hackenthorpe district of the City of Sheffield, England.

History
The bath house was built for Charles Herbert Pierrepont, 2nd Earl Manvers and the Lord of the Manor of Beighton in 1842, and initially was a hotel with spa baths beneath. Subsequently, it was used for many years as private dwellings. In the 1973 it was given Grade II listed building status. 

During the mid 1800s a committee was created consisting of Thomas Staniforth from the Thomas Staniforth & Co Sickle works, Edward Hobson, George Cox of Beighton and John Tillotson, schoolmaster of Beighton. A man named George Eadon was selected from eleven applicants who applied for the post of manager of the 'Bath Hotel', and was paid a salary of twenty pounds and was provided free rent and coal. 

By 1895 the baths were failing to make a profit and only a single plunge bath remained in use, it appears the hotel itself was closed around 1878 and it is believed that the Earl Manvers removed the marble from the building himself for personal use.

Around 1895 John Platts was the proprietor of the property, he was a well known gardener and a farmer.

By the time of the 1920s and 30s, the grounds of the bath house were transformed into a Pleasure Ground for children. Mr Moulson and William Smith were the proprietors at this time. The grounds featured a wishing well, a sand pit, swing boats, a paddling pool and the large lake behind the house was used for boating and fishing. There was also a 'wonder tree' in the wooded area beside the house, which was a large oak tree said to be over 1,000 years old. When the Second World War began in 1939, the grounds were closed.

The grounds was transferred to Sheffield Corporation in the 1950s, and in the early 2000s it became part of the Shire Brook Valley Local Nature Reserve.

The building was restored in 2000/2002 and for a time was open for tours by the public, but this has recently ceased.

In June 2018 renewed interest was brought to Birley Spa due to its neglect, and a Friends of Birley Spa group was formed.

The Friends Group was formed in response to the Councils intention to sell the building. The sale was withdrawn and the Bath House has been made an Asset of Community Value. Talks are ongoing with the Council to secure a sustainable future for the Spa. The building requires extensive repairs, due to lack of maintenance and neglect. Plans are underway for fundraising events, and applications to funding bodies will be submitted. Work has started with volunteers, supported by Park Rangers, to restore the grounds.

References

External links

Commercial buildings completed in 1842
Grade II listed buildings in Sheffield
Public baths in the United Kingdom
Spas
1842 establishments in England